Allandale is a small village in the Falkirk council area of Scotland. The entire village is a row of terraced housing along a section of the B816 road from Bonnybridge to Castlecary. The village is bordered to the north by the Forth & Clyde Canal and to the south by the former LMS railway.

History
The village of Allandale was built in 1904 to house workers of a new brickworks started by J.G Stein and Co. Dundas Cottages was built for management and office staff a few years later, the council built additional houses in the 1960s.
See www.allandalecottages.co.uk

Sports
In 1970 football club, Steins Thistle, was founded as a team for the workers of the Steins Brickworks, named after John Stein. Despite the closure of the brickworks, the football club remains to date and currently compete in the Central Scottish Amateur Football League.

References

External links

Falkirk Herald - Allandale immortalised by Steins’ legacy
Canmore - Castlecary, Allandale Cottages site record
Canmore - Allandale Fortlet site record

Villages in Falkirk (council area)